Aleksander Zajączkowski (born 10 January 1950) is a Polish wrestler. He competed in the men's Greco-Roman 48 kg at the 1976 Summer Olympics.

References

1950 births
Living people
Polish male sport wrestlers
Olympic wrestlers of Poland
Wrestlers at the 1976 Summer Olympics
People from Głubczyce
Sportspeople from Opole Voivodeship